Surdila may refer to one of two communes in Brăila County, Romania:

Surdila-Găiseanca
Surdila-Greci

See also 
 Surdu (disambiguation)
 Surduc (disambiguation)
 Surducu (disambiguation)
 Surdești (disambiguation)